The 2007 UAB Blazers football team represented the University of Alabama at Birmingham (UAB) in the 2007 NCAA Division I FBS football season, and was the 17th team fielded by the school. The Blazers were led by first-year head coach  Neil Callaway and played their home games at Legion Field in Birmingham, Alabama, and competed as a member of Conference USA. The Blazers finished their twelfth season at the NCAA I-A/FBS level and their ninth affiliated with a conference with a record of 2–10 (1–7 C-USA).

Schedule

Game summaries

Michigan State

In the first game of the Neil Callaway era, the Blazers would make their first-ever trip to the state of Michigan in this 55–18 defeat by the Spartans. The Blazers would fall behind 42–0 before Swayze Waters hit a 35-yard field goal before the half. After a safety early in the third, Waters would hit a pair of long field goals (50 and 47 yards) and score the seasons' first touchdown on a 15-yard Joseph Webb reception from Sam Hunt in the fourth. For the game, the Blazers were outgained on offense 593 to 226 total yards.

Florida State

On the road, the Blazers would take a 17–10 lead at the half only to give up 21 points in the third in this 34–24 defeat to the Seminoles. UAB would take the early lead on a 27-yard Swayze Waters field goal, and extend it to 10–0 on FSU's ensuing possession with Will Dunbar returning an interception 21-yards for the score. In the second, Sam Hunt would score on a 4-yard run to extend the lead to 17–3, before the Seminoles responded with a touchdown of their own in narrowing the lead to 17–10 at the half. Florida State would open the third with a pair of touchdowns to take a 24–17 lead, before UAB responded with a 16-yard Joseph Webb touchdown reception from Hunt to knot the game at 24. However, the Seminoles would close the game with 10 unanswered points to seal the 34–24 win.

Alcorn State

The first win of the Callaway era would come in the seasons first home game with a 22–0 victory over the FCS Braves of Alcorn State. Swayze Waters would star in hitting 5 field goals from 42, 32, 52, 22 and 38 yards respectively. The Blazers would visit the end zone only once on a 4-yard David Sigler touchdown reception from Sam Hunt in the second quarter. For the game, Waters set a team record for most field goals in a game, tied the team record for longest Blazer field goal (52 yards) and tied the conference record for most field goals in a game.

Tulsa

Mississippi State

Tulane

Houston

East Carolina

Southern Miss

UCF

Memphis

Marshall

Personnel

Coaching staff
 Neil Callaway – Head Coach
 Kim Helton – Offensive coordinator/tight ends
 Eric Schumann – Defensive coordinator/safeties
 Corey Barlow – Cornerbacks
 Tim Bowens – Receivers
 Lorenzo Costantini – Defensive line
 Steve Davenport – Running backs
 Will Friend – Offensive line
 Tyson Helton – Quarterbacks/recruiting coordinator
 Tyson Summers – Linebackers
 Steve Martin – Strength and Conditioning/Football & Baseball
 Ervin Lewis – Director of Football Operations

References

UAB
UAB Blazers football seasons
UAB Blazers football